Water supply and sanitation in Turkey is characterized by achievements and challenges. Over the past decades access to drinking water has become almost universal and access to adequate sanitation has also increased substantially. Autonomous utilities have been created in the 16 metropolitan cities of Turkey and cost recovery has been increased, thus providing the basis for the sustainability of service provision. Intermittent supply, which was common in many cities, has become less frequent. In 2004, 61% of the wastewater collected through sewers was being treated. In 2020 77% of water was used by agriculture, 10% by households and the rest by  industry.

Remaining challenges include the need to further increase wastewater treatment, to reduce the high level of non-revenue water hovering around 50% and to expand access to adequate sanitation in rural areas. The investment required to comply with EU standards in the sector, especially in wastewater treatment, is estimated to be in the order of Euro 2 billion per year, more than double the current level of investment.

Institutionally the sector is fragmented. Policy, regulatory and planning functions are dispersed between five Ministries, the State Hydraulic Works (DSI) and the State Planning Organization under the Prime Minister's Office. Service provision is the responsibility of about 2,400 municipalities and 16 utilities in the largest cities. External cooperation has played and continues to play a major role for water and sanitation in Turkey. Germany, France, the European Union and the World Bank are the major external partners.

Access 
In 2015, in Turkey, access to water was universal. Regarding sanitation, 95% of the population have access to "improved" sanitation, 98% of the urban population and 86% of the rural population. Subsequently, there are still, approximately, 4 million people without access to "improved" sanitation.

Access to water supply and sanitation in Turkey is high. Based on household surveys and census results, the Joint Monitoring Programme for Water Supply and Sanitation estimates that 100% of the Turkish urban population had access to an improved water source in 2007. In rural areas, where less than a third of the population lives, 96% had access. In urban areas 97% had access to improved sanitation facilities, compared to 75% in rural areas. In urban areas, 95% were connected to sewers, the remaining 5% being served by septic tanks.

Wastewater treatment 
There were 138 municipal wastewater treatment plants in Turkey as of 2004. According to the Ministry of Environment, 41% of waste water discharged from a sewage system was treated in 2004 (1,68 billion m3 of 2,77 billion m3). Mechanical treatment was applied to 28% of the wastewater treated, biological treatment to 58% and advanced treatment to 13%. 53% of the wastewater, treated or not, was discharged into fresh surface water bodies, 39% to the sea, 1% to fields and 6% to another receiving environment. In Istanbul the share of wastewater treated increased from 9% in 1993 to 95% in 2004.

Water resources and water use 
In 2008, 4.56 billion m3 of water was abstracted by municipalities or bought by them in order to be distributed by the local government. Of this amount, 40% was abstracted from dams, 28% from wells, 23% from springs, 4% from rivers, and 5% from lakes. 111.4 billion m3 of drinking water was sold to 20 million subscribers, and 4.8 billion Turkish Lira revenue was obtained. This implies that the average level of non-revenue water – water produced that was not billed – was 48% ((4.56-2.4)x100/4.56) and that the average tariff was 2 Turkish Lira per cubic meter (1.10 Euro/m3). According to the results of the 2008 Municipal Water Statistics Survey, water abstraction per capita was 215 liters per day in 2008. Actual billed consumption taking into account non-revenue water was 52% of that level, or 112 liters per day. In 2021 underground dams are being built against drought.

Municipal water use accounts for about 16% of total water use in Turkey, compared to 76% used by agriculture and 12% by industry. Total water withdrawals for all uses accounted for only 17% of total available water resources in an average year (average 1977–2001). Municipal water use thus accounted for only about 3% of available water resources. However, water availability is highly seasonal and is not equally distributed throughout the country. Local and regional water shortages occur despite ample average water availability. For example, in 2007 a severe drought hit the entire Mediterranean coast as well as Central Anatolia and threatened the water supply of Istanbul and Ankara.

Climate change 
Climate change in Turkey is putting pressure on water resources.

Legal and institutional framework

Policy and regulation 
There is no single water and sanitation law in Turkey, and there is no single institution charged with developing policies for water supply and sanitation or for regulating the sector. A number of laws on the environment, health and local government together form the legal framework of the sector. Local governments play a central role in the sector as service provider, partially mobilizing resources for investment financing from their own revenues and being responsible for the elaboration of location-specific Master Plans, feasibility studies and for the procurement of the necessary works.

At the national level, a number of government entities form the institutional framework of the sector. The State Planning Organization under the Prime Minister's Office is in charge of general investment planning through Five-Year Plans; the Ministry of Interior is in charge of supervising local governments through its General Directorate of Local Authorities; the Ministry of Public Works and Settlement controls the state-owned Bank of the Provinces, a source of financing for water supply and sanitation; the Ministry of Environment and Forestry is in charge of developing water resources as well as environmental monitoring and enforcement; the Ministry of Agriculture through the drinking water unit in the General Directorate for Rural Services (KHGM) is in charge of planning, financing and building rural drinking water supply; and the Ministry of Health is, in charge of monitoring drinking water quality.

Service provision 
The 16 largest cities in Turkey each have legally separate and financially autonomous municipal water and sanitation companies called Su ve Kanalizasyon Idaresi (SKIs). These utilities were created during the 1980s and 1990s, beginning with the establishment of ISKI in Istanbul in 1981. The boards of these companies are typically chaired by the mayor. Smaller cities provide services directly through municipal water and sewer departments. SKIs exist in the following metropolitan cities: Adana, ASKI – Ankara, Antalya, Bursa, ISKI – Istanbul, DISKI – Diyarbakir, Kayseri, Denizli, Eskişehir, Gaziantep, Izmir, Konya, Malatya, Mersin, Samsun, and Sanliurfa.

There were 3,225 municipalities in Turkey in 2008, including some very small municipalities. Before the municipal elections of March 2009, the number was reduced by 862 through reclassification of small municipalities with less than 2,000 inhabitants, bringing the number of municipalities to 2,363.

Private sector participation 
Private sector participation in the provision of water supply and sanitation in Turkey is mostly limited to the operation of water and wastewater treatment plants without direct contact with customers. An exception is the lease contract in Antalya from 1996 to 2002, where a private company directly provided water and sewer services to customers. In 1996 the city signed a lease contract with a private company to provide water and sanitation services for 10 years. The decision to opt for a lease was taken on the advice of a UK consulting firm without an options study that would have compared different alternatives of private sector participation. The contract was awarded after international competitive bidding with three bids submitted. It was awarded to the lowest qualified bidder called ANTSU, a consortium between the French water company Lyonnaise des Eaux (today Suez Environnement) and the Turkish firm ENKA (the latter left the consortium shortly after the contract was signed). Ownership of assets remained with the public company, Antalya Water Supply and Sewerage Authority (ASAT). ANTSU received an agreed remuneration per cubic meter of water collected from ASAT customers. Investments were partially financed through loans from the World Bank and the European Investment Bank. There were some slight improvements during the contract period, such as an increase of the continuity of water supply  from 19 to 23 hours per day. However, an important indicator, non-revenue water, stagnated at a high level of about 60%, while the private operator had aimed at reducing it to 30% within three years. Halfway through the contract period the private operator said it lost money and asked to increase its remuneration. When the municipality refused, ANTSU said it was obliged under Turkish law to liquidate itself. ASAT then assumed responsibility for operations in 2002 and the contract ended amidst compensation claims by both sides. In its completion report for the project that supported the lease, the World Bank concluded that the outcomes were unsatisfactory. However, there were also successes: For example, funds provided through the World Bank loan contributed to increase the share of sewerage connections from zero in 1996 to 35% of the urbanized area in 2003.

During the contract period the local government and the environmental authorities decided to substantially change the design of a planned wastewater treatment plant. The original plan had foreseen only a mechanical wastewater treatment plant and a sea outfall, considered sufficient by the World Bank to protect the environment of the Bay of Antalya. The new design included an activated sludge treatment plant that involved higher capital and operating costs. The plant was completed in 2002 and is being operated by a private company, separate from the lease company, under a Design-Build-Operate (DBO) contract.

Bulk water supply 
The State Hydraulic Works (Turkish: Devlet Su İşleri or DSİ) is an agency under the Ministry of Environment and Forestry responsible for the utilization of country's water resources. Besides water resources assessment and monitoring, hydropower production and bulk water supply for agriculture, DSİ is also responsible by law for the supply of domestic and industrial water to cities with more than 100,000 inhabitants. As of the 2000 census, there were 55 such cities in Turkey. DSİ supplied water to 26 million people in 45 cities.

As of the beginning of 2005, DSİ supplied annually a total of around 2.5 km³ domestic water complying with drinking water standards. This figure will reach 5.3 km³ with completion of the projects which are under construction, or at the final design and planning stages. Water supply projects developed by DSİ meet one third of the requirements for domestic and industrial water consumption.

Training 
The Turkish Union of Municipalities (TBB) trains staff of water and sanitation utilities in commercial and technical aspects. Previously this function has been undertaken by the Institute for Public Administration for Turkey and the Middle East, Türkiye ve Orta Doğu Amme İdaresi Enstitüsü (TODAIE).

Efficiency 
The level of non-revenue water (physical and commercial water losses) in Turkish cities is much higher than in other OECD countries except for Mexico. For example, in 2006 it was 45% in Kayseri, 51% in Diyarbakir and 69% in Adana. The level of non-revenue water in Istanbul decreased from more than 50% prior to 1994 to 34% in 2000 due to large investments in pipe replacement.

Financial aspects 
The level of tariffs and cost recovery in Turkey is relatively high for a middle-income country. However, the country still depends to some extent on grants and subsidized loans from external partners to finance its investment needs. Investments are particularly needed in the field of wastewater treatment in order to comply with EU directives.

Tariffs and cost recovery 
Water and sanitation tariffs in Turkish cities are set by local governments. For residential users most cities charge increasing-block tariffs. Commercial users and public institutions are charged a linear tariff that is close to or higher than the highest block of the residential tariff. Tariff levels vary across cities. During the 1990s, a period of high inflation in Turkey, some cities have indexed tariffs to inflation to prevent an erosion of tariffs. Under the indexation system tariffs are automatically increased every three months in line with the increase of the consumer price index. The level of cost recovery of utilities in Turkey is generally high, and some of them post moderate profits.

Investment 
Annual investments in the Turkish water and sanitation sector at the beginning of the 2000s stood at about US$1 billion per year, or about US$13 per capita and year. The cost for Turkey to comply with the Environmental Acquis Communautaire in water supply and sanitation has been estimated to be in the order of €34 billion for 2007-23 or annual investments of about €2 billion. Additional investments in industrial pollution control would be in the order or €15 billion.

Financing 
The main sources of financing for urban water supply and sanitation in Turkey are self-financing by utilities, central governmental transfers, subsidized loans from the Iller Bank (Bank of the Provinces), as well as grants and subsidized loans and external cooperation. Iller Bank provides not only loans, but also administrates the distribution of central government transfers to municipalities. In the 16 metropolitan cities of Turkey that have municipal utilities (SKIs), 10% of the transfers from the national government to municipal transfers are directly paid to the utilities, with the remaining 90% going to the municipalities.

External Cooperation 
The major external partners of Turkey in water supply and sanitation are the European Union, France and Germany.

European Union 
The European Union provides 134.3 million Euro of grants in 2007-09 for water supply and sanitation as part of its Instrument for Pre-Accession Assistance (IPA). The first project to be approved under IPA for water and sanitation in Turkey was for a Wastewater Treatment Plant in Ordu. A priority for IPA is the reduction of water losses.

The European Investment Bank also provides loans for water supply and sanitation in Turkey. As of 2010 it had several projects under implementation, of which the most recent one is the Samsun wastewater project signed in 2005 supported with a Euro 30 million loan. In addition, an Environmental Framework Loan for Iller Bank estimated to reach Euro 150 million for water, sanitation and solid waste management was under preparation in 2010.

France 
France provides subsidized loans for municipal infrastructure in Turkish cities through the Agence Française de Développement (AFD). In 2009 AFD provided loans to the cities of Istanbul (120 million Euro), Kayseri (22 million Euro ) and Konya (50 million Euro) for urban development, including water supply and sanitation. France also provides a 16 million Euro loan for the treatment of sludge from a wastewater treatment plant in Bursa.

Germany 
Between the late 1980s and 2006 the German government and the state-owned development Bank KfW provided 780 million Euros in grants and soft loans for water supply and sanitation in Turkey with a particular focus on cities in the poorer parts of Turkey. German development cooperation is being implemented by GIZ (technical cooperation) and KfW (financial cooperation) on behalf of the German government.

Germany has financed sanitation projects in Isparta, Tarsus, Siirt, Batman, Van and Diyarbakir, Fethiye and Malatya as well as water supply projects in Istanbul and Adana. In Ankara and Kayseri both water supply and sanitation projects have been supported. Projects are also under implementation in Sivas, Siirt, Batman and Van. The first mechanical-biological wastewater treatment plant in a Turkish metropolitan city, commissioned in 1997 in Ankara, has been financed by German financial cooperation.

GIZ has supported capacity development of staff working in municipal utilities in commercial and technical aspects through a project implemented from 2002 to 2006 in cooperation with the training institute TODAIE.

World Bank 
The World Bank currently finances a municipal services project implemented by Iller Bank. The project, initially approved in 2005, received a first loan of US$275 million and additional financing of US$240 million in 2010. The project finances investments in the cities of Antalya (water supply and sewerage), Denizli(water supply, sewerage and storm water drainage), Mersin (water supply), Beypazari (water supply, sewerage and wastewater treatment), Istanbul (sewerage in the Akfirat area), Kayseri (solid waste landfill) and Kirsehir (water, sewerage and storm water drainage).

The Istanbul Municipal Services Project, supported through a US$336 million loan and approved in 2007, had 43% of its proceeds earmarked for water supply and sanitation.

In the past the World Bank financed, among others, water and sanitation projects in Istanbul from the 1970s to the 1990s, in Izmir and Ankara in the late 1980s and 1990s, as well as in Antalya and Bursa in the late 1990s as well as in the early 2000s. The outcome of the project in Antalya, which involved a public-private partnership, was rated by the World Bank as unsatisfactory, because it was too big, had too many objectives, because of poor risk allocation between the public and the private partners and because there was a mismatch between revenues in local currency and debt in foreign currency.

See also 
Water supply and sanitation in Istanbul
Climate change in Turkey

References

External links 
 DSI - State Hydraulic Works
  ISKI - Istanbul water and sewer utility
  ASKI - Ankara water and sewer utility
  IZSU Izmir
  Adana ASKI